Science at the Crossroads was an anthology of the contributions of the delegation from the Soviet Union which attended the Second International Congress of the History of Science. Joseph Needham provided a foreword. It was republished with a new foreword and introduction in 1971. Alfred Rupert Hall wrote a scathing review, claiming that it had little impact in the Soviet Union and that most of the contributors careers led, rather, to the prison camp and the execution squad.

Contents
The 1971 edition included:

References

Science books